The Black Pacific was a punk rock music project that was started in 2010 by Jim Lindberg, the vocalist of Pennywise, and two previously unknown members, Alan Vega (drums) and Davey Latter (bass). They were signed to SideOneDummy Records and their self-titled debut album was released on September 14, 2010.

On October 8, 2010, some line-up changes were announced by the band: Marc Orrell, formerly of celtic punk band Dropkick Murphys has joined the band as second guitarist, and Gavin Caswell has joined as bassist, replacing Davey Latter who had to return to his drumming duties with his other band Everest.

In June 2010 (shortly after the completion of their first album), Jim announced that the Black Pacific had plans to release more music in the future. He also remarked that they had more songs written than could fit on their first album, and that (in June 2010) they had another batch of songs ready to record.

Band members
Current members
Jim Lindberg - lead vocals, guitar (2010–2012)
Alan Vega - drums, percussion (2010–2012)
Marc Orrell - guitar (2010–2012)
Gavin Caswell - bass (2010–2012)

Former members
Davey Latter - bass (2010)

Discography
The Black Pacific (2010)

Music videos
 "The System" (2010)
 "Living with Ghosts" (2010)

References

External links

The Black Pacific official website
The Black Pacific on Facebook

Musical groups established in 2010
American musical trios
Punk rock groups from California
2010 establishments in California